Baraipar is a Village in the province of Uttar Pradesh in northern India. It is approximately 40 kilometres north of Gorakhpur city near the border with Nepal on state highway-64 and National Highway-29 (NH-29) near Tahasil Campierganj in Gorakhpur District. The village is situated on the east river bank of Rapti and South of Sarua Tal (lake).
There are two famous temple that name are haththi maa ka Mandir and Saruaa ki samay Mata ki mandir
There is a primary school, a Senior secondary school, a primary health center and a farmer help center (Fertilizer/ seeds) of Government of India. Broad gauge trains of Indian Railways running, between Gorakhpur and Nautanwa/ Gonda passes through Campierganj 7 km away from this village. Also, the nearest market place to this village is Campierganj, Pharenda, Dhani bazar, Pipeeganj, Paniara and Mehdaval Bazar, in range of 20 km.

External links 
 
 
 
 Gorakhpur
 
 
 
 

Villages in Gorakhpur district